Fred Jowett (1879 – 5 October 1939) was a Welsh rugby union player who represented Wales, and the British Lions. Jowett played club rugby for Swansea, and county rugby for Glamorgan. His first and only cap was on 10 January 1903 at St Helens Ground in Swansea against England. He made his début in an experienced team, with only George Travers of Pill Harriers earning his first cap alongside Jowett. The match was a one sided affair, with Wales winning 21–5, thanks to a hat-trick of tries from Jehoida Hodges. Although playing his part in an excellent victory over England, Jowett was never selected again.

The next year Jowett was selected to represent Bedell Sivright's British Lions on their tour of Australia and New Zealand, and was selected for one test.

Jowett was a high scoring wing, and his 1902/03 season tally of 42 tries for Swansea is still a club record to this day. In 1905 the draw of professionalism proved too strong, and Jowett headed north to play for Hull Kingston Rovers, severing his ties with rugby union forever.

During World War I, Jowett was a corporal in the Welsh ammunition column.

International matches played
Wales
  1903

British Lions
  1904

Bibliography

References

1879 births
1939 deaths
British & Irish Lions rugby union players from Wales
British Army personnel of World War I
British Army soldiers
Hull Kingston Rovers players
Rugby league players from Swansea
Rugby league wingers
Rugby union players from Swansea
Rugby union wings
Swansea RFC players
Wales international rugby union players
Welsh rugby league players
Welsh rugby union players